Alfonso de la Cerda, called of Spain (France, 1289 - Gentilly, France, 1327) from the Castilian House of Ivrea was Archdeacon of Paris, baron of Lunel and Lord of Tafalla & Caparroso. He was the eldest son of Alfonso de la Cerda, called "the disinherited".

Biography
Hist father, Alfonso de la Cerda the disinherited moved to France, the country of his grandmother, where his second cousin Charles IV of France made him baron de Lunel and his namesake son was born. Alfonso of Spain became Archdeacon of Paris in 1322, Baron of Lunel in 1324 and Lord of Tafalla & Caparroso in 1325. He died in 1327, at the age of 38.

Family
Alfonso of Spain married Isabelle d'Antoing, Viscountess Ghent, the daughter of Hugh IV, Lord of Antoing, and Mary, Viscountess Ghent. He was the father of:
 Charles de la Cerda 1327-1354, Count of Angoulême and Constable of France.

References

Sources
 Europaische Stammtafeln, Vol.3.

House de la Cerda
1289 births
1327 deaths